Roberto Efrén Cerezo Torres (born 18 June 1946) is a Mexican politician from the Institutional Revolutionary Party. In 2009 he served as Deputy of the LX Legislature of the Mexican Congress representing the Federal District.

References

1946 births
Living people
Politicians from Mexico City
Institutional Revolutionary Party politicians
21st-century Mexican politicians
Deputies of the LX Legislature of Mexico
Members of the Chamber of Deputies (Mexico) for Mexico City